Qareh Pachanlu (also Romanized as Qāreh Pāchānlū; also known as Shāhūnī and Shāh Valī) is a village in Bastamlu Rural District, in the Central District of Khoda Afarin County, East Azerbaijan Province, Iran. At the 2006 census, its population was 47, in 11 families. The village is populated by the Kurdish Chalabianlu tribe.

References 

Populated places in Khoda Afarin County
Kurdish settlements in East Azerbaijan Province